Amorphophallus mekongensis is a species of tuberous plant in the family Araceae.   It can be found in Vietnam & Laos; in Viet Nam it is called nưa Cửu Long (or ~ Mê Kông).  No subspecies are listed in the Catalogue of Life.

References

External links 
 * 

mekongensis
Flora of Indo-China
Plants described in 1911